Armand Laroche (1826 – 1903), also known as Amand Laroche, was a French painter, who specialized in portraits and genre painting.

Biography

Born in Saint-Cyr-l'École (Seine-et-Oise). Arman Laroche was studying at École des beaux-arts de Versailles and École des beaux-arts de Paris, he was student of Ferdinand Wachsmuth and Michel Martin Drolling. He took part in the Paris Salon every year from 1846 up to 1903. He was awarded a bronze medal at the Exposition Universelle (1889), and an honourable mention at the Exposition Universelle (1900).

Works
Portrait of Sculptor Poitevin (1855), Musée des beaux-arts de Marseille
Portrait of a Young Woman (1872)
Blue Bird, featured at the Salon in 1882
Portrait of L-F Schützenberger (1884)
Le Réveil, featured at the Salon in 1886
Portrait of M. Lapostolet, featured at the Salon in 1887
Portrait of Melle Lainé, Artist of the Odeon, featured at the salon in 1888
La Rosée, featured at the Salon in 1889
Baigneuse, featured at the Salon in 1892
Female Nude by Pond With Water Lilies
Diana Bathing With the Nymphs

Gallery

References 
 Bénézit

External links 

 'Portrait of Sculptor Poitevin', Musée des beaux-arts de Marseille
 La Chronique des arts et de la curiosité : supplément à la Gazette des beaux-arts, 1903, BnF
 Salon de 1869
 Salon de 1876
 Catalogue illustré du Salon 1882
 Catalogue illustré du Salon 1886
 Catalogue illustré du Salon 1887
 Catalogue illustré du Salon 1888
 Catalogue illustré du Salon 1889
 Catalogue illustré du Salon 1892
 Mention honorable au l'exposition universelle de 1900

1826 births
1903 deaths
People from Saint-Cyr-l'École
19th-century French painters
French male painters
French Realist painters
Academic art
École des Beaux-Arts alumni
19th-century French male artists